Guram Guramovich Adzhoyev (born 27 February 1995) is a Russian football player of Yazidi heritage. He plays for FC Arsenal Tula.

Club career
Adzhoyev made his debut in the Russian Football National League for Arsenal Tula on 15 May 2016 in a game against FC Fakel Voronezh.

Adzhoyev made his Russian Premier League debut for Arsenal Tula on 1 April 2017 in a game against FC Tom Tomsk.

Personal life
His father, also named Guram Adzhoyev, was a professional footballer as well and is the current president of Arsenal Tula.

Career statistics

Club

References

External links
 
 
 Profile by Russian Football National League

1995 births
Sportspeople from Miskolc
Russian people of Kurdish descent
Living people
Russian footballers
Association football forwards
FC Dynamo Moscow reserves players
FC Arsenal Tula players
FC Khimik-Arsenal players
Russian Premier League players
Russian First League players
Russian Second League players